Sing When You're Winning is the third studio album by English singer-songwriter Robbie Williams. It was released on 28 August 2000 in the United Kingdom by Chrysalis Records and in the United States by Capitol Records. Following the critical and commercial success of I've Been Expecting You (1998), the North American release of The Ego Has Landed (1999) and the subsequent promotional tours for both albums, Williams reteamed with producers Guy Chambers and Steve Power to create new material for his next record. Whereas I've Been Expecting You used the Britpop genre for its overall sound, Sing When You're Winning incorporates a more post-millennial dance-pop approach while utilizing classic British rock elements. The album garnered positive reviews from critics. Sing When You're Winning debuted at number one in the UK, Germany, Ireland and New Zealand, as well as the top 10 in countries like Australia, Finland, Sweden and Switzerland. It spawned six singles: "Rock DJ", "Kids" (with Kylie Minogue), "Supreme", "Let Love Be Your Energy", "Eternity / The Road to Mandalay" and "Better Man".

Background and content
Following the 1998 release of his album I've Been Expecting You, and in the middle of promotion and touring in 1999, Williams found time to start the work on what would be his third studio album.

The sound of the album was described as seeing Williams move "farther away from the increasingly dated visions of Oasis-style Britpop to embrace post-millennial dance-pop, complete with the bruising beats and extroverted productions to match." The album features a variety of styles, "conjuring a panoply of classic British rock touchstones like psychedelia, slick country rock, Ian Dury, the Who, Elton John, and Madchester."

The album's title is a reference to a popular football chant of the same name that goes to the tune of "Guantanamera", Williams being a fan of Port Vale. The cover art features multiple images of Williams celebrating winning a trophy at Chelsea's stadium Stamford Bridge.

Initial releases do not feature Williams' name or the album title on the front cover, no track listing featured on the back cover; these were all changed for future releases. The images were taken by photographer Paul M. Smith and, along with Williams' complete football strip, were later sold at auction to raise money for his charity Give It Sum. Williams toured the United Kingdom with Kylie Minogue in October and November 2000 to promote the album, selling out in every venue.

The album contains a hidden message put on the album for humorous intent. After 24 minutes of silence following track 12, "The Road to Mandalay" (4:08 - 28:08), a spoken message from Williams saying "No, I'm not doing one on this album" is heard, which means that no hidden track on the album. This is a reference to how Williams' past three albums (including the compilation album The Ego Has Landed) each contain hidden tracks at the end of the album.

Commercial reception
When the album was released on 28 August 2000, it immediately became a hit in the United Kingdom, debuting at number-one and being certified 2× Platinum in the first week of release. The album also topped the charts in New Zealand, Ireland and Germany, and secured top ten placings in Argentina, Austria, Australia, Finland, Mexico, Sweden, Switzerland. Sing When You're Winning failed to reach the top 20 in Spain, reaching number 22. The album spent 91 weeks on the UK chart, going on to sell 2.4 million copies in the UK alone, being certified 8× Platinum by the BPI. The album became the best-selling album of 2000 in the UK, and the 51st-best-selling album in UK music history. The album found little success in the United States, however, peaking at 110 in the Billboard 200.

Critical reception

Initial critical response to Sing When You're Winning was positive. From Metacritic, which assigns a normalised rating out of 100 to reviews from mainstream critics, the album received an average score of 69, based on 11 reviews.

Singles
 "Rock DJ" was released as the album's first single. The song was inspired by Williams' UNICEF mentor, the late Ian Dury. The video was censored by Top of the Pops for its gore content, with many other channels following suit. Controversy ensued in the United Kingdom and many other countries, with the video showing Williams tearing chunks of skin and muscle from his body while performing a strip show, in an attempt to get noticed by a group of women. The track became an instant hit around the globe, hitting number one in the United Kingdom, becoming his third number-one single as a solo artist and exactly a year after his sell-out concert at Slane Castle. The song also reached number-one in Ireland, New Zealand, Mexico and Argentina and hit top-ten placings across Europe, Australasia and Latin America. Despite its worldwide success the song failed to break into the United States charts, although it did get some TV airplay on MTV and VH1. The song went on to win several awards including "Best Song of 2000" at the MTV Europe Music Awards, "Best Single of the Year" at the Brit Awards and an MTV Video Music Award for Best Special Effects. It went on to sell over 600,000 copies in the UK alone, and was certified Platinum by the BPI.
 "Kids", a collaboration with Australian pop icon Kylie Minogue, was released as the album's second single. The track was written when Minogue approached Williams to write some songs for her debut Parlophone album Light Years. Williams decided to include the track on his album and released it as a single, becoming an instant hit upon release in October of that year. The song hit number two in the United Kingdom and snared top 10 placings in Australia, New Zealand, Latvia, Mexico and several other countries. One of the biggest hits of 2000, "Kids" sold over 200,000 copies in the UK alone and was certified Silver.
 "Supreme" was released as the album's third single, and was promoted in various countries by several international-language versions, including versions of the song in French and Spanish.
 "Let Love Be Your Energy" was released as the album's fourth single, and was the first Robbie Williams music video not to feature Williams himself. Instead, the video was animated and featured Williams attempting to outrun a volcano.
 "Eternity", a track that was not featured on the album, was released in the summer of 2001 backed with "The Road to Mandalay", a song which appears as the final track from the album. "Eternity" was written by Williams in what he called "the most amazing summer ever". After years of non-stop work he took a month off and recorded this track, which became his fourth number-one single in the United Kingdom, selling over 70,000 copies in its first week. It also became a top ten hit all over Europe.
 "Better Man" was released as the album's sixth and final single, exclusively in Australia and New Zealand. The single was released to relative success there.

Track listing
All the tracks produced by Guy Chambers and Steve Power.

Personnel
Adapted from the album's liner notes.

Vocals

 Robbie Williams – vocals , backing vocals 
 Kylie Minogue – vocals 
 Crystal Adams – backing vocals 
 Andre Barreau – backing vocals 
 Andy Caine – backing vocals 
 Dave Catlin-Birch – backing vocals 
 Guy Chambers – backing vocals 
 Derek Green – backing vocals 
 Marielle Hervé – backing vocals 
 Katie Kissoon – backing vocals 
 Sylvia Mason-James – backing vocals 
 Steve McEwan – backing vocals 
 Tessa Niles – backing vocals 
 Gary Nuttall – backing vocals 
 Pauline Taylor – backing vocals 
 Claire Worrall – backing vocals 

Instrumentation

 Dave Bishop – saxophone 
 Winston Blissett – bass guitar 
 Pauline Boeykens – tuba 
 Dave Catlin-Birch – bass guitar , 12-string electric guitar 
 Guy Chambers – keyboards, guitar, piano , synthesizer, organ , clavinet , omnichord 
 Pete Davies – keyboards 
 Alex Dickson – electric guitar , autoharp 
 Melvin Duffy – pedal steel guitar 
 Andy Duncan – percussion 
 Fil Eisler – bass guitar 
 Mark Feltham – harmonica 
 Edgar Herzog – clarinet 
 Bob Lanese – trumpet 
 Brad Lang – bass guitar, double bass 
 Steve McEwan – electric guitar 
 Gary Nuttall – electric banjo 
 Phil Palmer – acoustic guitar, electric guitar, 12-string guitar 
 Steve Power – vocoder , glockenspiel 
 Chris Sharrock – drums , ambient kit , percussion 
 Neil Sidwell – trombone 
 Steve Sidwell – trumpet 
 Phil Spalding – bass guitar 
 Jeremy Stacey – drums 
 Neil Taylor – acoustic guitar , electric guitar

Technical

 Guy Chambers – production, arranger, orchestration 
 Steve Power – production, mixing
 Jim Brumby – programming, Pro Tools 
 Pete Davies – drum programming 
 Andy Duncan – drum programming , Pro Tools 
 Richard Flack – drum programming , Pro Tools 
 Nick Ingman – orchestration 
 Steve Price – orchestral engineering 
 Savvas Iossifidis – engineering
 Richard Woodcraft – engineering
 David Naughton – assistant mix engineering
 Tony Cousins – mastering

Charts

Weekly charts

Year-end charts

Certifications and sales

References

2000 albums
Robbie Williams albums